Sheikha Rima al-Sabah (born 1962) is a Lebanese-Kuwaiti former journalist, and a current UNHCR Goodwill Ambassador. 

She is married to the former Kuwaiti ambassador to the United States Salem Abdullah Al-Jaber Al-Sabah.

Early life and education 
Al-Sabah was born in Lebanon in 1962.

Adult like 
Al-Sabah worked as a war correspondent for United Press International. She moved to USA with her husband a few weeks before the September 11th attacks.

She became a UNHCR Goodwill Ambassador in January 2015  She is the  founder and the chair of Kuwait-America Foundation’s annual gala and noted for her socialising with presidents Clinton, Trump, and Biden.

Family life 
Al-Sabah is married to Salem Abdullah Al-Jaber Al-Sabah whom she met in 1983 when both were students in Beirut. They married in 1988 and have four sons.

References 

1962 births
Lebanese emigrants to Kuwait
Lebanese emigrants to the United States
Kuwaiti emigrants to the United States
Lebanese women journalists
21st-century Kuwaiti people
United Nations High Commissioner for Refugees Goodwill Ambassadors
Living people